"Sorry Go 'Round" is a limited edition single by the Finnish rock band Poets of the Fall with a special, black lacquered cover. Every copy has a unique number. It features two versions of the track, which have been remastered in comparison to the full album's version. The band also planned to include a remix of the song, but this idea has been abandoned. It is unknown if the remix was completed or if it will ever be released. Additionally, no music video has been made to promote the single. The single's release was originally planned on 26 July 2006 but was delayed to 16 August 2006 due to the popularity of the previous single, Carnival of Rust. The single peaked at number seven in the official Finnish singles chart.

Track listing

Charts

References

External links
"Sorry Go 'Round" lyrics
"Sorry Go 'Round" music sample
The official website of Poets of the Fall (available in English, Finnish and German)
The official MySpace of Poets of the Fall (contains four full songs to listen to)

Poets of the Fall songs
2006 singles
2006 songs